The toothed river herring or Papuan river sprat (Clupeoides papuensis) is a species of fish in the family Clupeidae. It is found in New Guinea.

References

toothed river herring
Freshwater fish of New Guinea
toothed river herring
Taxonomy articles created by Polbot